Tapiwa Sylvia Gwaza is a Malawian actress popular for her role as lawyer in the Malawian film, Seasons of a Life.

Career
Gwaza is a former cabin crew member for Air Malawi Ltd. She worked as an air hostess for 13 years prior to starting her acting career.
After resigning from her job at Air Malawi, she decided to take up acting and landed a role in Seasons of a Life.

Works
Seasons of a Life (2010)

Awards
Best Performance by an Actress in a Supporting Role - 2010 Africa Movie Academy Awards (AAMA)2010, Nigeria

References

Malawian women
Malawian film actresses
Living people
Best Supporting Actress Africa Movie Academy Award winners
Year of birth missing (living people)